Ed Ames (born Edmund Dantes Urick; July 9, 1927), who also recorded as Eddie Ames, is an American pop singer and actor. He is known for playing Mingo in the television series Daniel Boone, and for his pop hits of the mid-to-late 1960s including "My Cup Runneth Over", "Who Will Answer?", and "When the Snow Is on the Roses". He was also part of the popular 1950s singing group with his siblings, the Ames Brothers.

Early life and career

Ames was born in Malden, Massachusetts, United States, to Jewish parents Sarah (Zaslavskaya) and David Urick (aka Eurich), who had emigrated from Ukraine. He was the youngest of nine children, five boys and four girls.

Ames grew up in a poor household. He attended the Boston Latin School and was educated in classical and opera music, as well as literature.  While still in high school, the brothers formed a quartet and often won competitions around the Boston area. Three of the brothers later formed the Amory Brothers quartet and went to New York City, where they were hired by bandleader Art Mooney.  Playwright Abe Burrows helped the brothers along the way, suggesting the siblings change their group's name to the Ames Brothers.

The Ames Brothers were first signed on with Decca Records in 1947, but because of the Musician Union's ban in 1948, (a holdover from the 1942–1944 musicians' strike),
Decca released only three singles by the brothers, and one backing Russ Morgan. As the ban was ending, they signed with Coral Records, a subsidiary of Decca. They had their first major hit in the 1950s with the double-sided "Rag Mop" and "Sentimental Me".  The brothers later joined RCA Victor records and continued to have success throughout the 1950s with many hits like "It Only Hurts For a Little While", "You, You, You", and "The Naughty Lady of Shady Lane". The brothers made regular appearances on network television variety programs, and in 1955 briefly had a 15-minute show of their own.

Acting career

In the early 1960s, the Ames Brothers disbanded, and Ed Ames, pursuing a career in acting, studied at the Herbert Berghof School. His first starring role was in an off-Broadway production of Arthur Miller's The Crucible, going on to starring performances in The Fantasticks off-Broadway and Carnival!, which was on Broadway.

Ames was in the national touring company of Carnival. His dark complexion and sharp facial features led to his being cast regularly as a Native American. He played Chief Bromden in the Broadway production of One Flew Over the Cuckoo's Nest, opposite Kirk Douglas.

Talent scouts at 20th Century Fox saw Ames in the production and invited him to play the Cherokee tribesman, Mingo on the NBC television series Daniel Boone, with Fess Parker. His character's father was an English officer, the Fourth Earl of Dunmore, played in the show by Walter Pidgeon. In that show, Mingo was the Earl's eldest son and thus entitled to claim the title as the fifth Earl, but decided to remain part of the Cherokee Nation.

In an episode of Season One, Ames also portrayed Mingo's evil twin brother, Taramingo. Ames' main character was actually named Caramingo, but went by Mingo throughout the entire series.

Ames played a wanted murderer holed-up in a hotel during a smallpox quarantine on a 1962 The Rifleman episode ("Quiet Night, Deadly Night"), and guest-starred as Kennedy in the 1963 episode "The Day of the Pawnees, Part 2" on ABC's The Travels of Jaimie McPheeters, with Kurt Russell in the title role. He guest-starred in 1963 on Richard Egan's NBC modern western series, Redigo.

The Tonight Show Starring Johnny Carson
While playing Mingo on television, Ames developed some skill in throwing a tomahawk. This led to one of the most memorable moments of his career, when he appeared on The Tonight Show Starring Johnny Carson on April 27, 1965.

During the course of the show, Ames and Johnny Carson were discussing Ames' tomahawk throwing abilities. When Ames claimed that he could hit a target from across the room, Carson asked Ames if he could demonstrate this skill. Ames agreed, and a wood panel with a chalk outline of a cowboy was brought on to the stage. As the studio band played a bar of the theme music from Adventures of Pow Wow, Ames proceeded to throw the tomahawk, which hit the "cowboy" square in the groin with the handle pointing upward. This led to a very long burst of laughter from the audience, which has been called the longest sustained laugh by a live audience in television history.

After a moment, Ames proceeded to walk toward the target to retrieve the tomahawk but Carson stopped him and allowed the situation to be appreciated for its humor. Ames then said to Carson "Think I'm going into another business, John." To which Carson ad-libbed: "I didn't even know you were Jewish!" and "Welcome to Frontier Bris."

Ames then asked Carson if he would like to take a turn throwing, to which Carson replied: "I can't hurt him any more than you did." The clip became a favorite of Carson's own yearly highlight show and subsequent blooper television specials.

Summer stock
Later in his career Ames became a fixture on the Kenley Players circuit, headlining in Shenandoah (1976, 1979, 1986), Fiddler on the Roof (1977), South Pacific (1980), Camelot (1981), and Man of La Mancha (1984).

Singing career

Ames recorded under the name "Eddie Ames" while still with the Ames Brothers, releasing the single "Bean Song (Which Way To Boston?)" in January, 1957.

Ames returned to singing as a solo artist in 1965. Ames is known for his baritone voice. He released his first RCA Victor chart single, "Try to Remember". The song barely made the charts. A bigger success came in 1967 with "My Cup Runneth Over". The song was both a pop hit and an adult contemporary radio hit. He had less success on the Pop charts soon after, and only had Adult Contemporary hits with "Time, Time", "When the Snow Is on the Roses", and "Timeless Love", the latter written by Buffy Sainte-Marie. He did make the Pop Top Twenty one last time in his singing career with "Who Will Answer?" in 1968. "Apologize" reached No. 47 in the Canadian RPM Magazine hot singles chart.

Ames's distinctive baritone is a regular radio presence during Christmas season, as well, thanks to his version of "Do You Hear What I Hear?" The song received its best-selling treatment from Bing Crosby in 1962, but Ames' version, recorded a few years later, is in frequent holiday rotation.

Ames also sang the "Ballad of the War Wagon" in the John Wayne/Batjac Productions movie, The War Wagon in 1967.

Personal life
Ed Ames married Sarita (Sara) Cacheiro in 1947 and they had three children, Sonya, Ronald, and Linda (aka Marcila, who died in 2007). The couple divorced October 5, 1973 in Santa Monica, California. Ames married Jeanne Arnold Saviano in 1998.

While maintaining his career, he attended UCLA, receiving his degree in theater and cinema arts in 1975. 

At the age of 47, Ames, saying "I am a secular Jew, but I feel strongly about Israel and the Jewish communities of Europe", became president of the Los Angeles chapter of the Zionist Organization of America.

While appearing in Daniel Boone, Ames maintained homes in Woodland Hills, Los Angeles, and Teaneck, New Jersey.

From 1968 until 1987, he also owned a percentage of the Phoenix Suns.

Discography

Singles

Albums

Try to Remember, RCA Victor 2781, 1963
The Ed Ames Album, RCA Victor 2944, 1964
My Kind of Songs, RCA Victor 3390, 1965
It's a Man's World, RCA Victor 3460, 1966
More I Cannot Wish You, RCA Victor 3636, 1966
My Cup Runneth Over, RCA Victor 3774, 1967
Time, Time, RCA Victor 3834, 1967
Christmas with Ed Ames, RCA Victor 3838, 1967
When the Snow Is on the Roses, RCA Victor 3913, 1968
Who Will Answer?, RCA Victor 3961, 1968
Apologize, RCA Victor 4028, 1968
The Hits of Broadway and Hollywood, RCA Victor 4079, 1968
A Time for Living, a Time for Hope, RCA Victor 4128, 1969
The Windmills of Your Mind RCA Victor 4172, 1969
The Best of Ed Ames, RCA Victor 4184, 1969Love of the Common People, RCA Victor 4249, 1969Sing Away the World, RCA Victor LSP-4381, 1970This is Ed Ames, RCA VPS-6023, 2 Record Set, 1970Christmas is the Warmest Time of the Year, RCA Victor LSP-4385, 1970Sings the Songs of Bacharach and David, RCA Victor LSP-4453, 1971Somewhere My Love RCA Camden CAS 2598, 1972Ed Ames, RCA Victor LSP-4634, 1972Ed Ames Remembers Jim Reeves, RCA Victor LSP-4683, 1972Songs from Lost Horizon and Themes from Other Movies, RCA Victor LSP-4808, 1972Who Will Answer/My Cup Runneth Over , Collectables COL-2704, 1997The Very Best of Ed Ames, Taragon TARCD-1070, 2000The Very Best of Ed Ames'', RCA/BMG 07863 69394–2, 2001

References

External links

 
 
 
 Ed Ames biography (Patterson & Associates)
 Ed Ames: My Cup Runneth Over album information
 Ed Ames recordings at the Discography of American Historical Recordings.

1927 births
Living people
20th-century American male actors
20th-century American singers
21st-century American male actors
American crooners
American male film actors
American male television actors
American people of Ukrainian-Jewish descent
American Zionists
Coral Records artists
Decca Records artists
Jewish American musicians
Jewish American male actors
Jewish singers
Male actors from Los Angeles
Male actors from Massachusetts
Musicians from Los Angeles
People from Malden, Massachusetts
People from Teaneck, New Jersey
People from Woodland Hills, Los Angeles
Phoenix Suns owners
RCA Victor artists
Singers from Massachusetts
Traditional pop music singers
UCLA Film School alumni
20th-century American male singers
21st-century American male singers
21st-century American singers
21st-century American Jews